John Byrne,  (September 1832 – 10 July 1879) was a British Army soldier and an Irish recipient of the Victoria Cross, the highest award for gallantry in the face of the enemy that can be awarded to British and Commonwealth forces.

Life
Byrne was born at Castlecomer, County Kilkenny in Ireland, in September 1832.

Byrne was about 22 years old, and a private in the 68th Regiment of Foot (later The Durham Light Infantry), British Army during the Crimean War. He was awarded the Victoria Cross for his actions at the Battle of Inkerman on 5 November 1854 on the Crimean Peninsula. When his regiment was ordered to retire, Private Byrne went back towards the enemy, and, at the risk of his own life, brought in a wounded soldier, under fire. On 11 May 1855 he bravely engaged in a hand-to-hand contest with one of the enemy on the parapet of the work he was defending, prevented the entrance of the enemy, killed his antagonist, and captured his arms.

He later achieved the rank of corporal. He died, aged 46, in Newport, Wales.

The medal
The only medal on display is his New Zealand campaign medal, held in the Durham Light Infantry Museum.

A Victoria Cross medal (missing the suspender bar and ribbon) was found by Tobias Neto in the mud of the River Thames on 17 December 2015, the medal having the date of "November 5, 1854" engraved on the reverse. Of the 16 VCs awarded for actions during the Battle of Inkerman, two were unaccounted for—those won by John Byrne and John McDermond of the 47th (Lancashire) Regiment of Foot, the other 14 being in private collections or museums. However, in an article published on the UK Detector Net web forum, the finder is seen to confirm that the medal was established as that awarded to John Byrne.

References

Sources
John Byrne at Find-A-Grave
Biography, lightinfantry.me.uk

1832 births
1879 deaths
Irish soldiers in the British Army
Crimean War recipients of the Victoria Cross
Irish recipients of the Victoria Cross
British Army personnel of the Crimean War
British military personnel of the New Zealand Wars
Durham Light Infantry soldiers
Recipients of the Distinguished Conduct Medal
People from County Kilkenny
19th-century Irish people
British Army recipients of the Victoria Cross
Military personnel from County Kilkenny
Burials in Wales